Yaviza Airport  is an airstrip serving Yaviza, a town in the Darién Province of Panama. Yaviza is the southern end of the Pan-American Highway and the beginning of the Darién Gap.

The runway is just southeast of the town, across the Chucunaque River. North approach and departure will cross the water. There is a small pond at the southern end of the runway.

See also

Transport in Panama
List of airports in Panama

References

External links
OpenStreetMap - Yaviza
OurAirports - Yaviza Airport

Bing Maps - Earlier image, Yaviza Airstrip

Airports in Panama
Buildings and structures in Darién Province